The Suzuki Katana AY50 is a 49cc scooter produced by Suzuki since 1997 and sold primarily in Europe. It is named after the katana samurai sword, as well as the early 1980s motorcycle of the same name. As a result, the scooter was widely criticised by the motorcycle press and enthusiasts of the classic motorcycle over the name as for damaging credibility of the Katana name.

The designation "AY" indicates that it has a two-stroke engine (A) and that it is intended for use in urban areas (Y).

Design 
Some of the parts used on the Katana are clearly inspired by racing, like the carbon-look Magneti-Marelli instruments and the Showa upside-down front suspension. A helmet can be stored in a space below the seat.

Specifications 
The powerplant of the Katana is a two-stroke engine with a displacement of 49 cubic centimeters manufactured by a joint-venture between Suzuki and Franco Morini producing 2.43 kW. Being just below 50 cm3, it is regarded as a moped in most countries. In addition to the air-cooled AY50, a liquid-cooled version designated the AY50R is produced.

The engine of the AY50 is also used in the Suzuki Estilete UF50 and Zillion UX50.

As with most popular scooters and mopeds, many aftermarket modifications and replacement parts to increase acceleration and top speed exist. However, in most countries tuning of 50 cm3 vehicles will change their legal status to be a motorcycle rather than  a moped, and an appropriate drivers licence and road registration is required to use them on public roads.

Katana AY50
Motor scooters
Motorcycles introduced in 1997
Mopeds
Two-stroke motorcycles